Gunnar Bahr (born 21 October 1974) is a German sailor who won a silver medal in the Soling class with Jochen Schümann and Ingo Borkowski at the 2000 Summer Olympics. He was decorated on 2 February 2001 by the President of the Federal Republic of Germany, Johannes Rau, with the Silver Laurel Leaf.

References

External links
 
 
 

1974 births
Living people
Sportspeople from Berlin
German male sailors (sport)
Olympic sailors of Germany
Olympic silver medalists for Germany
Recipients of the Silver Laurel Leaf
Olympic medalists in sailing
Sailors at the 2000 Summer Olympics – Soling
European Champions Soling
Medalists at the 2000 Summer Olympics